The men's individual competition in orienteering at the 2001 World Games took place on 18 August 2001 in the Iijima Forest in Akita, Japan.

Competition format
A total of 38 athletes entered the competition. Every athlete had to check in at control points, which were located across the course.

Results

References

External links
 Results on IOF website

Orienteering at the 2001 World Games